Johannes Lambrechts "Janro" van Niekerk (born 5 November 1982) is a South African rugby union footballer. His regular playing position is loosehead prop.

After Van Niekerk's Griquas contract expired at the conclusion of the 2014 Currie Cup Premier Division, Van Niekerk moved back to Paarl to pursue a work opportunity.

References

External links

itsrugby.co.uk profile

Living people
1982 births
Afrikaner people
South African people of Dutch descent
South African rugby union players
Rugby union props
Griquas (rugby union) players
Boland Cavaliers players
Rugby union players from Worcester, South Africa